Molteno Dam is a small but historic dam, on the lower slopes of Table Mountain in Western Cape, South Africa. Still in service, it was established in 1877 and is now located in the suburb of Oranjezicht, Cape Town.

Background and construction

In earlier days, the infant settlement of Cape Town had been supplied with water from Table Mountain by way of canals or "grachts" (such as Buitengracht, Kaizergracht and Heerengracht - now major streets). When these canals had to be covered due to public health concerns, the elders of the city agreed on the need to build a dam up on the Table Mountain slope above the growing city, to store water from the mountain's springs. This water would otherwise have flowed directly into the sea - a shameful waste in the eyes of the city's administrators. By the late 1860s, Cape Town was also facing severe water restrictions, partly due to its expanding population.

The dam's actual construction was part of a huge expansion of infrastructure that was begun by the government of the country's first Prime Minister John Molteno (after whom it was later named), who appointed the Cape's first water engineer Mr John Gamble, as well as the mayor David Graaff. Soon after the dam was opened, the first power-plant in South Africa, the Graaff Electric Lighting Works (named after the Mayor), was constructed next to the reservoir.

The dam was intended to hold over 50,000,000 gallons of water, in sandy porous clay which presented an engineering challenge from the outset. 
The solution, only implemented years later, involved a mixture of excavation and masonry-supported embankments.

History
The reservoir provided sufficient storage capacity for the young city for decades to come, until massive urbanisation in the 20th century meant drawing on the much larger Western Cape Water Supply System.

Several unusual incidents have punctuated the dam's long history. With the invention of the hot air balloon, renowned balloonist Isidore Michaels made an ascent in Cape Town, from the nearby public gardens, in spite of the prevailing winds. To the horror of spectators, his balloon swept towards the mountain and landed in the middle of the dam, entangling and drowning the balloonist. 
A structural disaster occurred in the 1880s. The reservoir was overfilled and accidentally breached, causing a wave of water to rush down into the city. The deluge destroyed houses, uprooted trees and swept away belongings. Following its repair however, the dam has served Cape Town faithfully and still supplies the city centre today.

Modern usage
The dam, and the nearby Molteno Spring (one of over 20 springs located in the Cape Town city bowl), form part of the natural waterway that was originally known as "Camissa" (meaning "Sweet Waters" in Khoi). This became part of a network of streams and grachts that historically stretched across early Cape Town. A citizen activated, non-profit community programme is currently underway to restore the city's historic water systems, of which the dam formed a small but crucial part.

While the greater city has far out-grown it, the dam is still used as part of the city's modern water system, supplying the Company's Garden among other areas. Together with the adjacent De Waal Park, its premises are currently a free and open recreation area for the community.

See also
Oranjezicht
List of reservoirs and dams in South Africa

References

External links
 The Environmental History of Water - The Molteno Dam
facebook.com: Molteno Reservoir
facebook.com: Molteno Hydroelectric power station — provided Cape Town with street lights, while London still used gas lamps.
RECLAIM CAMISSA's citizen activated Google Map — Cape Town's water infrastructure listed and marked.

Dams in South Africa
Buildings and structures in Cape Town
Reservoirs in South Africa
Dams completed in 1881
1881 establishments in the British Empire
19th-century architecture in South Africa